Ioannis Chrysafis (1873 – October 12, 1932) was a Greek gymnast.  He competed at the 1896 Summer Olympics in Athens.

Chrysafis was the team leader of the Ethnikos Gymnastikos Syllogos team that placed third of the three teams in the event, giving the members of the team bronze medals.

External links

1873 births
1932 deaths
Gymnasts at the 1896 Summer Olympics
19th-century sportsmen
Olympic gymnasts of Greece
Greek male artistic gymnasts
Olympic bronze medalists for Greece
Olympic medalists in gymnastics
Medalists at the 1896 Summer Olympics
Gymnasts from Athens